Anchorage Island may refer to:
 Anchorage Island (Antarctica)
 Anchorage Island (Cook Islands)
 Anchorage Island (New Zealand)
 Anchorage Island (Nunavut), Canada